Jeffrey S. "Jeff" Hale (born August 8, 1966) is an American Republican politician. He is a current member of the Mississippi House of Representatives, having represented Mississippi's 24th House district since 2016.

Biography 
Jeffrey S. Hale was born on August 27, 1966, in Corinth, Mississippi He has graduated from Northwest Mississippi Community College. By occupation, he is a fire chief and director of sales. He was elected to represent Mississippi's 24th House district as a Republican in the Mississippi House of Representatives for the 2016-2020 term. In the 2016-2020 term, he was the vice-chair of the House's Private Property committee. He was re-elected for the 2020-2024 term. In the 2020-2024 term, he is the vice-chair of the House's Energy committee.

References 

1966 births
Living people
Republican Party members of the Mississippi House of Representatives